This is a partial list of edible molluscs. Molluscs are a large phylum of invertebrate animals, many of which have shells. Edible molluscs are harvested from saltwater, freshwater, and the land, and include numerous members of the classes Gastropoda (snails), Bivalvia (clams, scallops, oysters etc.), Cephalopoda (octopus and squid), and Polyplacophora (chitons).

Many species of molluscs are eaten worldwide, either cooked or raw. Some mollusc species are commercially exploited and shipped as part of the international trade in shellfish; other species are harvested, sold and consumed locally. Some species are collected and eaten locally but are rarely bought and sold. A few species of molluscs are not commonly eaten now, but were eaten in historical or prehistoric times.

The list is divided into marine and non-marine (terrestrial and freshwater) species, and within those divisions, the lists are primarily arranged taxonomically, so that related species are grouped together.

Marine species

Gastropods (snails)
These sea snails are edible; some are listed by genus, others by species and others by their common name.

Most species of abalone, including:

  Abalone
  Black abalone
  Blacklip abalone
  Green abalone
  Green ormer
  Haliotis corrugata
  Red abalone
  White abalone
  Pāua

Many species of true limpets, including:

  Cellana exarata
  Cellana sandwicensis
  Patella caerulea
  Patella ferruginea
  Patella rustica
  Patella ulyssiponensis
  Patella vulgata

Many species of winkles, including:

  Austrolittorina antipodum
  Common periwinkle
  Littorina sitkana
  and other species in the family Littorinidae

Many species of conchs, including:
  Lobatus gigas
  Laevistrombus canarium

Some rock snail species, including:
 Chorus giganteus
 Concholepas concholepas
 Turbo bruneus
 Turbo cornutus
 Turbo intercostalis
 Tectus niloticus

Many species of whelks, Buccinidae, including:

  Channeled whelk
  Lightning whelk
  Knobbed whelk

Other sea snail groups:
 Bullacta exarata, a bubble snail
 Amphibola crenata, an air-breathing mud snail
 melo melo a volute snail
 euspira heros a large moon snail

Bivalves (clams etc.)
Note that the common names of edible bivalves can be misleading, in that not all species known as "cockles" "oysters", "mussels", etc., are closely related.

Ark clams (Arcidae), including:
 Blood cockle
  Senilia senilis

Many species of true mussels, family Mytilidae, including:

 Blue mussel
 California mussel
  Mediterranean mussel
  Mytilus coruscus
  Perna canaliculus
  Perna perna
  Perna viridis

Many species of Pen shell including:
  Atrina rigida
  Pinna carnea
  Pinna nobilis

Many species of true oysters, including:

 Auckland oyster
  Dredge oyster
 Mangrove oyster
  Ostrea angasi
  Ostrea edulis
 Pacific oyster
 Rock oysters
 Saccostrea glomerata (Sydney rock oyster)
Saccostrea echinata (Tropical black-lip rock oyster
 Portuguese oyster
 Eastern oyster

Many species of true cockles, including:

  Clinocardium nuttallii
  Cerastoderma edule
  dinocardium

Many species of scallop, including:
  Argopecten irradians
  Argopecten purpuratus
  Pecten jacobaeus
  Pecten maximus
  Pecten novaezealandiae
  Placopecten magellanicus

Many species of venus clam, including:

 Austrovenus stutchburyi
  Chione californiensis
  Grooved carpet shell
 Quahog
  Ruditapes largillierti
  Saxidomus gigantea
  Leukoma
  Saxidomus nuttalli
  Paphies
  Paphies australis
  Paphies ventricosa
 Pismo clam
 Smooth clam
  Tuatua
  Venerupis philippinarum

Many species in the family Mactridae, including:

 Atlantic surf clam
  Mactra stultorum
  Meretrix (genus)
  Meretrix lyrata
  Tresus
  Tresus capax
  Tresus nuttallii
  Spisula aequilateralis

Many species of razor clams Pharidae, including:
 Atlantic jackknife clam
  Ensis
  Ensis macha
 Pacific razor clam
 Pod razor
 Razor shell
  Sinonovacula

Several species of bean clams Donacidae, including:
  Plebidonax deltoides

Other bivalve species, including:

  Arctica islandica
 Geoduck
  Lithophaga lithophaga
  Mya truncata
  Pholas dactylus
  Placunidae - windowpane oysters, not true oysters
 Pinctada
 Soft-shell clam

Chitons (coat of mail shells)
  Chiton magnificus
  Gumboot chiton
  Katharina tunicata
  West Indian fuzzy chiton

Cephalopods (octopus, squid etc.)

Many species of octopus including:
 Amphioctopus fangsiao
  Bathypolypus valdiviae
  Enteroctopus dofleini
  Enteroctopus megalocyathus
  Octopus cyanea
  Octopus macropus
Many species of squid are used as food, including:
  Humboldt squid
  Japanese flying squid
  longfin inshore squid
  veined squid
  European squid

Some species of cuttlefish are eaten:
  Sepiadarium kochi
  Sepiella inermis

Other cephalopods:
  Nautilus

Non-marine species

Edible freshwater and land mollusc species include freshwater snails, clams, mussels and land snails:

Land snails
 Escargot
Cornu aspersum
  Helix lucorum
  Helix nucula
  Helix pomatia
  grove snail

Freshwater clams
 Corbicula fluminea

See also

 Consider the Oyster
 List of seafood dishes
 Mollusca – uses by humans
 Oyster bar
 Oyster farming
 Oyster festival

References

External links
 
 
 
 
 

 List
Molluscs, List Of Edible